Aplysia depilans, the depilatory sea hare, is a species of sea hare or sea slug, a marine opisthobranch gastropod mollusk in the family Aplysiidae. Its name has led to a folk etymology that its consumption caused hair loss.

Distribution
This sea hare occurs in the eastern Atlantic and the Mediterranean. It can be found mostly in shallow water of about 1.5 to 10 m. It avoids the intertidal zone because the animals cannot absorb atmospheric oxygen and so die after stranding relatively quickly. Occasionally some are trapped in tide pools at low tide. The adults feed primarily on algae of the genus Ulva, especially sea lettuce Ulva lactuca. During the planktonic phase of life they eat single-celled phytoplankton.

Description
Individuals can grow up to 40 cm long and weighs up to 380 g. Their skin is dark brown to reddish brown, with white to light brown blotches. It has a yellow inner shell that is thinner, flatter and more poorly calcified than other sea hares and measures about 1.5 cm long.

Behavior
When threatened they emit a white or purple ink. Aplysia depilans are one of the seven species of the genus which are known to swim occasionally rather than crawl. Although hermaphrodites, they cannot self-fertilize and require a partner.

Classical reference
The Greek Sophist Philostratus writes that the Roman Emperor Titus (died 81 AD) was poisoned by his brother Domitian with a sea hare and that his death had been foretold to him by Apollonius of Tyana. However, other classical sources such as Suetonius and Cassius Dio maintain he died of natural causes.

References

depilans
Gastropods described in 1791
Taxa named by Johann Friedrich Gmelin